Issaquah is a city in King County, Washington, United States. The population was 40,051 at the 2020 census. Located in a valley and bisected by Interstate 90, the city is bordered by the Sammamish Plateau to the north and the "Issaquah Alps" to the south. It is home to the headquarters of the multinational retail company Costco. Issaquah is included in the Seattle metropolitan area.

History

"Issaquah" is an anglicization of the Southern Lushootseed placename /sqʷáxʷ/, meaning either "the sound of birds", "snake", or "little stream". "Squak Valley", an older name for the area, also derives from this same Native American name.

In September 1885, the then-unincorporated area was the scene of an attack on Chinese laborers who had come to pick hops from local fields. Three of the laborers died from gunshot wounds, and none of the attackers were convicted of any wrongdoing.

The city was officially incorporated on April 29, 1892. Initially a small mining town, the city has changed noticeably both in its appearance and economic focus. Issaquah was originally developed to service the mining industry (on the two nearby mountains that now lend their names to the Cougar/Squak Corridor Park), and began as the town of "Gilman". As the mining deposits neared depletion in the late 1890s, other companies started to realize Issaquah's potential to support a lucrative lumber business. These companies exported timber from Issaquah and other small, local towns to Seattle and larger, rapidly growing communities throughout western Washington. These early boom industries, however, faded into a period of relative quiet by the time of the Great Depression. The town remained fairly placid through the succeeding decades, with Boeing providing the majority of employment in the area. Microsoft and other technological industries moved into Redmond and other cities in the area, and later established operations in Issaquah itself. Both Boeing and Microsoft have significantly affected Issaquah's history, cultural development, and diverse population through their active community participation and attraction of outside residents. In June 1996, Costco moved its global headquarters to Issaquah from nearby Kirkland.

Geography
Its neighboring cities are Bellevue to the west and Sammamish to the north. Issaquah resides within the Mountains to Sound Greenway.

Issaquah is surrounded on three sides by what are known locally as the Issaquah Alps: Cougar Mountain on the west, Squak Mountain to the south, and Tiger Mountain to the southeast. To the north of Issaquah is Lake Sammamish. Cougar and Squak Mountains are home to sizable neighborhoods on their lower slopes, though the bulk of all three mountains are preserved in public ownership as Squak Mountain State Park, Cougar Mountain Regional Wildland Park, West Tiger Mountain NRCA, and Tiger Mountain State Forest. Geologists have noted the chemical and geological content of these three mountains to be much different from that of the Cascade Range, because they are not volcanic in origin, while the entire Cascade Range is postulated to have formed from volcanic action. They believe that these three mountains are the remains of a much older mountain range long since eroded by earthquakes, volcanic action, and shifting plates.

Climate
Issaquah has a warm-summer Mediterranean climate (Köppen: Csb) with chilly, extremely wet winters and warm, moderately humid summers. Although there is no dry season in Issaquah, winters are many times wetter than the summers.

Economy
Warehouse retailer Costco has been headquartered in Issaquah since 1996. Other major Issaquah employers include Microsoft, Siemens Medical Solutions' Ultrasound Group, Overtime Technologies, Boehm's Candies, and Darigold. Apparel wholesaler SanMar is also headquartered in the city.

Demographics

According to a 2012 estimate, the median income for a household in the city was $87,074, and the median income for a family was $115,814. The per capita income for the city was $47,949.

According to the Washington State Office of Financial Management, Issaquah ranked 6th of 279 eligible incorporated communities in population growth between 2000 and 2005. Forbes.com ranked Issaquah the 2nd fastest-growing suburb in the state, and the 89th in the nation.

2010 census
As of the census of 2010, there were 30,434 people, 12,841 households, and 8,018 families residing in the city. The racial makeup of the city was 74.7% White, 1.4% African American, 0.4% Native American, 17.5% Asian, 0.1% Pacific Islander, 1.8% from other races, and 4.1% from two or more races. Hispanic or Latino of any race were 5.8% of the population.

There were 12,841 households, of which 33.0% had children under the age of 18 living with them, 51.9% were married couples living together, 7.9% had a female householder with no husband present, 2.7% had a male householder with no wife present, and 37.6% were non-families. 30.1% of all households were made up of individuals, and 10.9% had someone living alone who was 65 years of age or older. The average household size was 2.34 and the average family size was 2.95.

The median age in the city was 36.8 years. 23.7% of residents were under the age of 18; 5.5% were between the ages of 18 and 24; 35.5% were from 25 to 44; 22.6% were from 45 to 64; and 12.7% were 65 years of age or older. The gender makeup of the city was 47.7% male and 52.3% female.

The population has increased immensely since then such as in the 2020 census it revealed 40,058 people lived in Issaquah.

2000 census
As of the census of 2000, there were 11,212 people, 4,840 households, and 2,908 families residing in the city. The population density was 1,330.9 people per square mile (514.1/km2). There were 5,195 housing units at an average density of 616.7 per square mile (238.2/km2). The racial makeup of the city was 87.95% White, 0.88% African American, 0.63% Native American, 6.04% Asian, 0.11% Pacific Islander, 1.46% from other races, and 2.93% from two or more races. Hispanic or Latino of any race made up 4.95% of the population.

There were 4,840 households, out of which 29.5% had children under the age of 18 living with them, 47.3% were married couples living together, 9.6% had a female householder with no husband present, and 39.9% were non-families. 31.0% of all households were made up of individuals, and 7.8% had someone living alone who was 65 years of age or older. The average household size was 2.27 and the average family size was 2.87.

In the city the population was spread out, with 22.2% under the age of 18, 7.3% from 18 to 24, 36.5% from 25 to 44, 24.0% from 45 to 64, and 10.0% who were 65 years of age or older. The median age was 37 years. For every 100 females, there were 91.9 males. For every 100 females age 18 and over, there were 88.1 males.

The median income for a household in the city was $57,892, and the median income for a family was $77,274. Males had a median income of $55,049 versus $36,670 for females. The per capita income for the city was $34,222. About 3.4% of families and 4.8% of the population were below the poverty line, including 5.5% of those under age 18 and 4.7% of those age 65 or over.

Transportation

Highways and roads
Issaquah is bisected by Interstate 90, which runs from Seattle to Boston, and Washington State Route 900, which connects the city to neighboring Renton. There is a chronic traffic congestion problem on Front Street, which traverses the historic downtown. Proposals have been made to create a bypass, but opponents have argued that this will only result in more sprawl in the area beyond downtown and thus bring in more traffic and pollution. In 2008, the Issaquah City Council voted to cancel the 15-year-running SE Bypass project. In addition, King County has no funding in its seven-year capital plan to improve Issaquah-Hobart Road, the southern terminus of the proposed bypass.

Public transportation

Bus service in Issaquah is provided by King County Metro as well as regional Sound Transit routes to Seattle and Bellevue. There are two primary park-and-rides in the city, at Issaquah Transit Center and Issaquah Highlands Park & Ride, which have a total of 1,999 parking spaces.

Since August 1995, the city and King County Metro provided a free circulator bus (route 200) between business districts and community centers in Issaquah as a form of traffic congestion relief.

As part of the expansion of Sound Transit services, a Link light rail line to Issaquah from Bellevue is proposed to begin service by 2041.

Local attractions

Issaquah Alps
The Issaquah Alps are a range of highlands situated in close proximity to the city of Issaquah. This scenic region offers a variety of hiking trails and other outdoor activities, and is primarily composed of three distinct peaks: Tiger Mountain, Cougar Mountain, and Squak Mountain.

Issaquah Valley Trolley

The Issaquah Valley Trolley was a project initiated by the Issaquah Historical Society, which aimed to introduce a regular heritage trolley service on the remaining section of railroad track in downtown Issaquah. The society organized a trial operation in 2001-02, providing public rides in a trolley car borrowed from Yakima Valley Trolleys. While the Issaquah Historical Society had acquired three trolleys of its own by 2010, the planned service had not yet commenced due to two of the cars being narrow gauge and incompatible with the standard gauge rails left in Issaquah. Additionally, all three cars were not in operating condition.

However, a federal transportation grant was obtained, providing funds for track evaluation and repairs. In 2012, one of the two narrow gauge cars was sent to the Gomaco Trolley Company to be refurbished and regauged to standard gauge. The restored trolley car, previously known as ex-Lisbon 519, returned to Issaquah in August 2012, and regular public rides started in October 2012. The trolley service operated seasonally and on weekends only. Unfortunately, the service was discontinued in November 2020 as a result of increasing costs and financial pressures on its operator, the Issaqauah History Museums.

The Trolley Project had some proponents who hoped to extend trolley service by reinstalling the track along the eastern shore of Lake Sammamish, which the county had removed several years ago. They envisioned the trolley service being extended to a northern re-extension of the removed track to the southern tip of Lake Sammamish or beyond to downtown Redmond. However, the opening of the East Lake Sammamish Trail in March 2006 along that proposed line put an end to the possibility of Issaquah-Redmond service.

Village Theatre
The Village Theatre has presented live stage plays on its main stage in downtown Issaquah since 1979. It is an Equity theater.

Salmon Days Festival
Issaquah Salmon Days is a two-day award-winning festival held in Issaquah on the first full weekend of October every year. It is initiated by a parade, celebrates the return of the salmon to their birth waters, and praises Issaquah's history, culture, and ethnic diversity. This free festival encompasses several arts and crafts conventions, attracting many Northwest artists; these artisans feature wood, glass, jewelry, paintings, pottery and metal artworks for sale in booths spread all across the downtown and historic area. There are four stages for entertainment such as live music. Sporting events include 5 km/10 km runs (and a 3 km run for children), a fencing invitational, bike rides, and a golf tournament. Memorial Field, adjacent to the city hall, hosts a "Field of Fun" providing free entertainment for children of all ages, thanks to the many festival sponsors. Visitors are encouraged to visit the newly restored Salmon Hatchery to view the returning salmon in close detail. In 2005, the register revealed over 400,000 people attended the Salmon Days Festival.

Cougar Mountain Zoo

The Cougar Mountain Zoo is located on the north slope of Cougar Mountain, just to the west of Issaquah. This  zoo offers a glimpse at many endangered species from across the globe, including many endangered birds from around the world and small lemurs from Madagascar. The highlight of the zoo for many observers is the cougar, named Nashi. Nashi is provided enrichment on a near-daily basis, which consists of a stimulant to keep him active mentally and physically. The zoo currently specializes in eight "worlds" of animals: cougars, lemurs, cranes, reindeer, macaws, wallabies, ratites, camelids.

On June 16, 2007, another world was added to the list, when the zoo welcomed its newest members, two male tiger cubs. Named Taj and Almos, they are the only Bengal tigers in Washington state. The Zoo is open for general admission Wednesday through Sunday, 9 a.m. to 5 p.m. (excluding the month of December). Each December the Zoo also offers a special Reindeer Festival, during which people may come view, and feed Santa's Reindeer, and visit the "big guy" in person.

Issaquah Salmon Hatchery
The Issaquah Salmon Hatchery was built in 1936 under the federal Works Project Administration. It is located on the Issaquah Creek within the city limits of Issaquah. The hatchery is owned and operated by the Washington State Department of Fish and Wildlife. It annually raises about 4 million Chinook (King) and Coho (Silver) salmon which then migrate from the Issaquah Creek to Puget sound and on to the North Pacific. Friends of the Issaquah Salmon Hatchery (FISH) is a non-profit organization that trains volunteer guides who lead free educational tours of the hatchery and advocates retaining and improving the historic hatchery. Local elementary schools often raise small numbers of salmon eggs that are spawned in the hatchery and release them into the creeks as part of their science curriculum on the salmon life cycle. The Issaquah Salmon Hatchery is located in the cultural and geographical heart of Issaquah and is the Department of Fish and Wildlife's most visited hatchery, with an estimated 350,000 visitors a year.

Gilman Village

Gilman Village is a specialty shopping center created from rescued buildings dating back to the origins of the Issaquah community. Gilman Village was founded in 1972, when developers Marvin and Ruth Mohl started saving old, unwanted farming and mining buildings, as well as pioneer homes, from around Issaquah. They moved, renovated and combined them into an attractive retail area in a park-like setting. Their goal was to create a haven for independent shops and restaurants. In saving the buildings, the intent was to honor the character and ambiance of the old community rather than to create a museum. Still, the buildings that house the shops and restaurants of Gilman Village represent a significant portion of Issaquah's history.

The 40-plus shops and restaurants that make up Gilman Village became one of Puget Sound's best known and most distinctive shopping destinations. In its initial decades, Gilman Village was a destination while Issaquah was still a somewhat rural area. Over time, Gilman Village began to compete with other local shopping centers for tenants serving the Issaquah population.

Designers of Gilman Village have included the Baylis Architects, Richard Haag Associates and landscape architect Stephen G. Ray. Their combined efforts have won official recognition by the King County Board of Realtors in 1976 and the Issaquah Design Commission in 1977 for quality of design and landscaping. In 1985, The Bellevue Chamber of Commerce presented the Eastside Quality of Life Award to Gilman Village for "the pleasures it gives through its rich discoveries of space and forms".

Flight
Paragliders and hang gliders launch from Tiger Mountain in Issaquah.

Government
The City of Issaquah uses the mayor-council form of government. The City Council acts as the legislative body. The City Council consists of seven councilmembers, who each have 4 year staggered terms.

The mayor of Issaquah is currently Mary Lou Pauly, whose first term expires on December 31, 2021. She was elected on November 7, 2017, with 64.19% of the vote.

Education
Public education for 21,358 students within the city and surrounding area is provided by the Issaquah School District, which operates 28 schools in and around Issaquah.

Healthcare
Swedish Medical Center opened a full-service hospital and healthcare facility in the Issaquah Highlands with a capacity of 175 inpatient beds and a 24-hour emergency room in 2012.

Notable people

Ray Allen, basketball player
Kyle Seager, 3rd Basemen for the Mariners
Brian Basset, comic strip artist
Isaac Brock, lead singer, guitarist, banjoist and songwriter for Modest Mouse
Jay Buhner, former Seattle Mariners baseball player from Kentucky. Nicknamed "Bone"
Deb Caletti, author
David Call, actor
Colin Curtis, former member of the New York Yankees
Joseph C. Decuir, IEEE fellow who made important contributions to early computer graphics and video games
Cynthia Geary, actress from Mississippi
Ken Griffey Jr., former Seattle Mariners player
Margaret Larson, journalist
Phil Lucas, documentary filmmaker
Patrick Monahan, lead singer of rock band Train
Jeff Nelson, baseball player
Chris Pirillo, founder and maintainer of Lockergnome and host of Gnomedex and VloggerFair
J. J. Putz, baseball player
Nate Query, bassist for The Decemberists
Rick Rizzs, Seattle Mariners sportscaster
Mark Rosewater, Magic: The Gathering head designer
Detlef Schrempf, basketball player
Paul Sorrento, former Seattle Mariners player
Mel Stottlemyre, Seattle Mariners pitching coach from Missouri
Ichiro Suzuki, baseball player
Dave Valle, baseball player, fill-in sportscaster for the Seattle Mariners
Omar Vizquel, Venezuelan baseball player
Brian Yorkey, Tony Award– and Pulitzer Prize–winning playwright, lyricist, and theatre director

Sister cities
 Sunndal, Norway
 Chefchaouen, Morocco (since 2007)

See also
 Issaquah-Sammamish Reporter

References

External links

Official website
Issaquah Historical Society

 
Cities in Washington (state)
Cities in King County, Washington
Cities in the Seattle metropolitan area
Populated places established in 1892
Washington placenames of Native American origin